Teodoro Orozco Puente (born 22 October 1963 in Concordia) is a Mexican former football defender who managers Cocodrilos F.C. Lázaro Cárdenas. He is commonly known as Teo Orozco by players and fans.

Teodoro Orozco was a squad member at the 1985 FIFA World Youth Championship held in the Soviet Union, where he played four games.

He scored his first goal for Irapuato in a 1–1 draw vs Atletico Potosino on 31 August 1986

International Caps 

Teodoro Orozco's Caps for Mexico in 1985

Honours

Club
Puebla F.C.
Primera División de Mexico:
Winners (1):   1982–83

Irapuato F.C.
Segunda División de México:
Winners (1):   1984–85

Monterrey F.C.
Primera División de Mexico:
Winners (1):   1992–93

External links 
 Mexico 1985 Championship squads

References

1963 births
Living people
Association football defenders
Mexico international footballers
Mexico under-20 international footballers
Liga MX players
Irapuato F.C. footballers
Club Puebla players
C.F. Monterrey players
Footballers from Coahuila
Mexican football managers
Irapuato F.C. managers
Mexican footballers